Gary Guthman is an American jazz musician from Portland Oregon. 

From 1999 to 2001, he starred in the Big Band Musical Theatre production of "Forever Swing".

References

External links

Official website

Living people
American jazz trumpeters
American male trumpeters
American jazz bandleaders
Year of birth missing (living people)
Musicians from Portland, Oregon
21st-century trumpeters
21st-century American male musicians
American male jazz musicians